Millar Burrows (Wyoming, Ohio, October 26, 1889 – April 29, 1980) was an American biblical scholar, a leading authority on the Dead Sea scrolls and professor emeritus at Yale Divinity School. Burrows was director of American School of Oriental Research in Jerusalem (now the William F. Albright School of Archaeological Research), and later president of the American Schools of Oriental Research. His grandson, Edwin G. Burrows (1943–2018), was an American historian and winner of the Pulitzer Prize (1999).

Early life and education
Burrows was born on October 26, 1889 in Wyoming, Ohio. He was one of three sons born to Edwin Jones, a businessman, and Katharine Douglas (Millar) Burrows. He studied at Cornell University, graduating in 1912. He then attended the Union Theological Seminary, New York to train for ordination, and he graduated with a Bachelor of Divinity (BD) degree in 1915.

While working as a minister, Burrows also undertook part-time graduate studies. He studied for his doctorate at Yale University under Charles Cutler Torrey, and he graduated in 1925. His dissertation was titled "The Literary Relations of Ezekiel".

Career

Ordained ministry
In 1915, Burrows was ordained as a minister of the Presbyterian Church. Then, from 1915 to 1919, he ministered at a rural church in Texas. For the next year he supervised a survey for the Texas Interchurch World Movement. From 1920 to 1923, he was a pastor and taught the Bible at Tusculum College in Tennessee.

Academic career
Burrows was internationally known for his prompt editing of the Dead Sea manuscripts of Cave One, and was able to communicate the results of research in language understandable to the public. Burrows gave working names to several of the scrolls, such as the "Manual of Discipline" to 1QS. Burrows worked on the Isaiah scroll, pointing out its consistency with the Masoretic text.

Burrows also wrote on the Hebrew Bible and New Testament. On the Bible he once noted that it is concerned with three subjects: religion, agriculture, and war.

Works
 Founders of Great Religions 1931
 An Outline of Biblical Theology 1946
 Palestine is Our Business 1949
 The Dead Sea Scrolls 1955
 More Light on the Dead Sea Scrolls 1958
 Jesus in the first three Gospels 1977

References

People from Wyoming, Ohio
1980 deaths
American biblical scholars
Dead Sea Scrolls
1899 births
Cornell University alumni
Union Theological Seminary (New York City) alumni
20th-century Presbyterian ministers
Tusculum University faculty